Sweet syndrome (SS), or acute febrile neutrophilic dermatosis, is a skin disease characterized by the sudden onset of fever, an elevated white blood cell count, and tender, red, well-demarcated papules and plaques that show dense infiltrates by neutrophil granulocytes on histologic examination.

The syndrome was first described in 1964 by Robert Douglas Sweet.  It was also known as Gomm–Button disease in honour of the first two patients Sweet diagnosed with the condition.

Signs and symptoms

Acute, tender, erythematous plaques, nodes, pseudovesicles and, occasionally, blisters with an annular or arciform pattern occur on the head, neck, legs, and arms, particularly the back of the hands and fingers.  The trunk is rarely involved. Fever (50%); arthralgia or arthritis (62%); eye involvement, most frequently conjunctivitis or iridocyclitis (38%); and oral aphthae (13%) are associated features.

Cause
SS can be classified based upon the clinical setting in which it occurs: classical or idiopathic SS, malignancy-associated SS, and drug-induced SS.

Systemic diseases
SS is a reactive phenomenon and should be considered a cutaneous marker of systemic disease.  Careful systemic evaluation is indicated, especially when cutaneous lesions are severe or hematologic values are abnormal. Approximately 20% of cases are associated with malignancy, predominantly hematological, especially acute myelogenous leukemia (AML). An underlying condition (streptococcal infection, inflammatory bowel disease, nonlymphocytic leukemia and other hematologic malignancies, solid tumors, pregnancy) is found in up to 50% of cases. Attacks of SS may precede the hematologic diagnosis by 3 months to 6 years, so that close evaluation of patients in the “idiopathic” group is required.

There is now good evidence that treatment with hematopoietic growth factors—including granulocyte colony-stimulating factor (G-CSF), which is used to treat AML, and granulocyte-macrophage colony-stimulating factor—can cause SS. Lesions typically occur when the patient has leukocytosis and neutrophilia but not when the patient is neutropenic. However, G-CSF may cause SS in neutropenic patients because of the induction of stem cell proliferation, the differentiation of neutrophils, and the prolongation of neutrophil survival.

Associations
Although it may occur in the absence of other known disease, SS is often associated with hematologic disease (including leukemia), and immunologic disease (rheumatoid arthritis, inflammatory bowel disease, Behçet's syndrome).

Pregnancy associated Sweet syndrome typically present in first or second trimester. It may recur with subsequent pregnancy, but there seems to be no risk to the fetus.

A genetic association has been suggested, but no specific genetic link has been identified.

Diagnosis
The clinical differential diagnosis includes pyoderma gangrenosum, infection, erythema multiforme, adverse drug reactions, and urticaria. Recurrences are common and affect up to one third of patients.

Laboratory studies
Studies show a moderate neutrophilia (less than 50%), elevated ESR (greater than 30 mm/h) (90%), and a slight increase in alkaline phosphatase (83%). Skin biopsy shows a papillary and mid-dermal mixed infiltrate of polymorphonuclear leukocytes with nuclear fragmentation and histiocytic cells. The infiltrate is predominantly perivascular with endothelial-cell swelling in some vessels, but vasculitic changes (blood clots; deposition of fibrin, complement, or immunoglobulins within the vessel walls; red blood cell extravasation;inflammatory infiltration of vascular walls) are absent in early lesions.Perivasculitis occurs secondarily, because of cytokines released by the lesional neutrophils. True transmural vasculitis is not an expected finding histopathologically in SS.

Definition
Sweet described a disease with four features: fever; leukocytosis; acute, tender, red plaques; and a papillary dermal infiltrate of neutrophils. This led to the name acute febrile neutrophilic dermatosis. Larger series of patients showed that fever and neutrophilia are not consistently present. The diagnosis is based on the two constant features, a typical eruption and the characteristic histologic features; thus the eponym "Sweet's syndrome" is used.

Treatment
Systemic corticosteroids such as (prednisone) can produce rapid improvement and are the “gold standard” for treatment. The temperature, white blood cell count, and eruption improve within 72 hours. The skin lesions clear within 3 to 9 days. Abnormal laboratory values rapidly return to normal. There are, however, frequent recurrences. Corticosteroids are tapered within 2 to 6 weeks to zero.Resolution of the eruption is occasionally followed by milia and scarring. The disease clears spontaneously in some patients. Topical and/or intralesional corticosteroids may be effective as either monotherapy or adjuvant therapy.
Oral potassium iodide or colchicine may induce rapid resolution.Patients who have a potential systemic infection or in whom corticosteroids are contraindicated can use these agents as a first-line therapy.
In one study, indomethacin, 150 mg per day, was given for the first week, and 100 mg per day was given for 2 additional weeks. Seventeen of 18 patients had a good initial response; fever and arthralgias were markedly attenuated within 48 hours, and eruptions cleared between 7 and 14 days.
Patients whose cutaneous lesions continued to develop were successfully treated with prednisone (1 mg/kg per day). No patient had a relapse after discontinuation of indomethacin.
Other alternatives to corticosteroid treatment include dapsone, doxycycline, clofazimine, and cyclosporine. All of these drugs influence migration and other functions of neutrophils.

See also
 Chloroma
 List of cutaneous conditions
 Periodic fever syndrome, also known as autoinflammatory diseases or autoinflammatory syndromes

References

External links 

Erythemas
Reactive neutrophilic cutaneous conditions
Syndromes
Rare diseases